Skyedance is a Celtic fusion group, founded by fiddler Alasdair Fraser in 1996.

Discography

 Way Out to Hope Street (1997)
 Labyrinth (2000)
 Live in Spain (2002)

Band members

 Alasdair Fraser (fiddle, viola)
 Mick Linden (Fretless bass)
 Peter Maund (percussion)
 Eric Rigler (Scottish bagpipes, uilleann pipes)
 Paul Machlis (piano, keyboard)
 Chris Norman  (wooden flute, piccolo)

External links
Culburnie artist profile

Celtic fusion groups